Dejan Janjić (born April 8, 1995) is a Serbian professional basketball player who last played for Hercegovac Gajdobra of the Second Basketball League of Serbia.

Professional career 
In his professional career, Janjić had two stints with his hometown team Vojvodina and he played one season for Napredak Kruševac.

On July 19, 2018, Janjić signed a multi-year contract for the Mega Bemax of the Basketball League of Serbia. On August 8, 2019, Janjić signed for Bosnian team Sloboda Tuzla.

References

External links 
 Profile at realgm.com
 Profile at eurobasket.com
 

1995 births
Living people
ABA League players
Basketball League of Serbia players
KK Hercegovac Gajdobra players
KK Mega Basket players
KK Napredak Kruševac players
KK Vojvodina players
KK Vršac players
OKK Sloboda Tuzla players
Serbian expatriate basketball people in Bosnia and Herzegovina
Serbian expatriate basketball people in Qatar
Serbian men's basketball players
Shooting guards
Basketball players from Novi Sad
Serbian men's 3x3 basketball players